Casares is one of thirteen parishes (administrative divisions) in Quirós, a municipality within the province and autonomous community of the Principality of Asturias, in northern Spain.

The population is 131.

Villages
 Casares
 Faedo
 Fresneo
 La Muela
 La Pachuca
 La Vigutierre
 Toriezo

Parishes in Quirós